Newton Abbot College is an 11-19 secondary school situated in Newton Abbot, Devon.  The College, recognised by Ofsted as a good  School, offers education for GCSE and Sixth Form students.

History
Newton Abbot College was established as the Grammar School for the town in 1904 and continued as such until the introduction of the comprehensive education system in 1975 when the name changed to Knowles Hill School.  In 1993, Knowles Hill School was awarded Grant Maintained status. This change offered more direct control for the school management and thereby to achieve higher standards. The Grant Maintained Schools framework was later amended to a Foundation School structure.  The introduction of the Trust School status offered all schools a similar independence.
 
In  2008 Knowles Hill  School was rebranded as Newton Abbot College with the fresh identity shown  through a new uniform. The changed ethos forms the basis for the continued  success of Newton Abbot College.  In August 2011, Newton Abbot College became an Academy Trust.

References

External links
 Official website
 Ofsted report and performance data
 2014 Exam Results

Academies in Devon
Educational institutions established in 2008
Secondary schools in Devon
2008 establishments in England
Newton Abbot